Good Grief, Charlie Brown: A Tribute to Charles Schulz is a documentary television special that features a tribute to Charles M. Schulz and his creation Peanuts.

The television special, the first of the 2000s, was originally aired on the CBS Television Network on February 11, 2000, one day before Schulz died.

Cast 
 Scott Adams - Himself
 Eugene Cernan - Himself
 Walter Cronkite - Host/Himself
 Jim Davis - Himself
 Matt Groening - Himself
 Charles M. Schulz - Himself
 Cathy Guisewite - Herself
 Jean Schulz - Herself
 Donna Wold - Herself
 Christopher Johnson - Charlie Brown (voice)
 Bill Melendez - Snoopy (voice)

External links 
 

2000 documentary films
Peanuts television documentaries
American documentary films
2000 television specials
Documentary films about comics
2000s American television specials
Documentary specials